The Institute of Certified Professional Managers (ICPM) is a US-based, non-profit, educational institute and certification body affiliated with the James Madison University College of Business, that provides education and certification in management to managers, supervisors and leaders working in all industries.  It was founded in 1974.

Certified Manager 
The Institute of Certified Professional Managers (ICPM) sponsors the professional Certified Manager (CM) certification.  Through a comprehensive program of management and leadership development and assessment, the CM  certification validates managerial competency and leadership potential.

The CM certification program comprises application, training and assessment.  CM applicants meet eligibility requirements for education and experience to receive approval to pursue the CM certification.  Training on the comprehensive CM body of knowledge comprises 75–90 hours and can be completed in groups, as classroom training, or individually, as self-directed study. A job task analysis performed periodically confirms the knowledge, skills and abilities and forms the basis of the CM body of knowledge. Applicants control the pace of program completion within 15 months.

The CM certification is obtained by meeting eligibility requirements and passing three CM exams.  Certificants can use the “CM” professional credential after their name, e.g. John Smith, CM. Certificants complete professional development activities annually and pay a professional fee ($50) to maintain current CM status.

History 
The Institute of Certified Professional Managers (ICPM) was established in 1974 through  a grant from the George R. Brown Foundation.  The Institute was formed to enhance recognition of management as a profession and to provide direction in the study of management.  Two organizations founded ICPM:  the International Management Council (IMC) and the National Management Association (NMA).

The International Management Council (IMC) was founded in 1903 by foremen who were members of YMCA.  Initially, named the Industrial Management Club, its mission was to train line managers for jobs in manufacturing.  IMC chapters were formed in over 40 US states and internationally in Taipei, Taiwan and Japan.  In 1971, the organization’s name was changed to the International Management Council and its membership expanded to include company presidents, managers and first line supervisors.  In 2003, IMC merged with the National Management Association.

The National Management Association (NMA) was founded in 1925 by Mr. Charles F. Kettering, a pioneer in human resource development.  Initially named the National Association of Foreman, today it goes by "NMA . . . THE Leadership Development Organization" to reflect its focus on leadership development.  NMA is a national, non-profit leadership development organization headquartered in Dayton, Ohio with a membership of over 22,000.

See also 
Professional certification (Business)
Chartered Manager (disambiguation)
Certified Business Manager
Certified MBA (CMBA)
Certified Management Consultant

References 
 Bittel, Lester and Newstrom, John W. What Every Supervisor Should Know. 1992.
 Norman, Cohen and Harris, Phillip. Guide to National Professional Certification Programs. 1994.
 United States Department of Labor. Occupational Outlook Handbook, 2006-2007 Edition. 2006.

External links 
 Official website
 Main website at James Madison University

Business and finance professional associations
Professional titles and certifications